Broadway-Blues-Ballads is an album by the singer/pianist/songwriter Nina Simone, released in 1964.

Track listing 

 "Don't Let Me Be Misunderstood" (Bennie Benjamin, Gloria Caldwell, Sol Marcus) - 2:48
 "Night Song" (Lee Adams, Charles Strouse) - 3:06
 "The Laziest Gal in Town" (Cole Porter) - 2:19
 "Something Wonderful" (Oscar Hammerstein II, Richard Rodgers) - 2:46
 "Don't Take All Night" (Bennie Benjamin, Sol Marcus) - 2:54
 "Nobody" (Alex Rogers, Bert Williams) - 4:18
 "I Am Blessed" (Bennie Benjamin, Sol Marcus) - 2:57
 "Of This I'm Sure" (Bennie Benjamin, Sol Marcus) - 2:37
 "See-Line Woman" ([traditional] American folk, George Bass, Nina Simone) - 2:38
 "Our Love (Will See Us Through)" (Bennie Benjamin, Sol Marcus) - 3:01
 "How Can I?" (Bennie Benjamin, Sol Marcus) - 2:05
 "The Last Rose of Summer" (Thomas Moore, Richard Alfred Milliken, Nina Simone) - 3:08
 on some CD releases the single "A Monster" is added as a bonus track. (Bennie Benjamin, Sol Marcus) - 2:47

Personnel 

 Nina Simone – piano, vocals on all tracks, and arranger on track 10
 Rudy Stevenson – flute on track 9
 Lisle Atkinson – percussion on track 9
 Bobby Hamilton – drums on track 9
 Horace Ott – arranger and conductor on tracks 1,5,7,8,10,11,13
 Hal Mooney – arranger  and conductor on tracks 2,3,4,6,12
 unknown orchestra

References 

1964 albums
Nina Simone albums
Philips Records albums
Albums produced by Hal Mooney
Albums arranged by Hal Mooney
Albums conducted by Hal Mooney
Albums arranged by Horace Ott
Albums conducted by Horace Ott
Albums arranged by Nina Simone